INS Visakhapatnam is the lead ship and the first of the  stealth guided-missile destroyers of the Indian Navy. The ship, commissioned on 21 November 2021, is one of the largest destroyers in service with the Indian Navy.

Construction

The keel of Visakhapatnam was laid down on 12 October 2013 and she was launched on 20 April 2015 at Mazagon Dock Limited of Mumbai. This was made under Make In India initiative. The ship steering and stabiliser system was manufactured by Larsen & Toubro and hydraulics by Polyhydron Systems..

On 21 June 2019, a fire that started in the air conditioning room of INS Visakhapatnam resulted in the death of one contract worker. The damage from the fire was reported to be limited.

During Navy Day 2020, Chief of the Naval Staff announced that INS Visakhapatnam  has started its sea trials.

Commissioning
Visakhapatnam was delivered to the Indian Navy on 28 October 2021 and commissioned on 21 November 2021 by Defence Minister Rajnath Singh at the Indian Navy's Western Naval Command, headquartered in Mumbai.

Service History
On 11 January 2022, Visakhapatnam successfully fired an advanced variant of Brahmos missile in sea-to-sea mode validating its extended range and improvements.

Gallery

See also

References

Visakhapatnam-class destroyers
Destroyers of the Indian Navy
Ships built in India
2015 ships